Neville Madziva (born 2 August 1991) is a Zimbabwean cricketer. He is a right-arm medium-fast bowler who can bat in the lower-order.

He was introduced to Zimbabwe cricket team when South Africa toured Zimbabwe in August 2014. He made his One Day International debut at Queens Sports Club in the first of a three match series. He played one more match in the series in which he took the wicket of Wayne Parnell but failed with the bat.

He returned to the Zimbabwe team in the last match of Tri-Series where he took the wickets of Hashim Amla and JP Duminy. With the bat he scored three runs as Zimbabwe lost the match by 63 runs.

He made his Twenty20 International debut for Zimbabwe against India on 17 July 2015.

In September 2018, he was named in Zimbabwe's squad for the 2018 Africa T20 Cup tournament. In December 2020, he was selected to play for the Rhinos in the 2020–21 Logan Cup.

References

External links
 

1991 births
Living people
Zimbabwean cricketers
Zimbabwe One Day International cricketers
Zimbabwe Twenty20 International cricketers
Mid West Rhinos cricketers
Sportspeople from Kadoma, Zimbabwe